Yeylaqi-ye Ardeh Rural District is a rural district (dehestan) in Pareh Sar District, Rezvanshahr County, Gilan Province, Iran. At the 2006 census, its population was 2,518, with a total of 636 families. The rural district has 30 villages.

References 

Rural Districts of Gilan Province
Rezvanshahr County